Callum Keith Rennie (born 14 September 1960) is a British-born Canadian actor who started his career in Canadian film and television projects, where his portrayal of Stanley Raymond Kowalski on the television series Due South was his first international success. After years acting in over 125 Canadian and international projects, he became widely known for his portrayal of Leoben Conoy on Battlestar Galactica, and following that, his role as record producer Lew Ashby on the Showtime series Californication. Frequently cast as a bad guy in movies (and more often in numerous guest appearances on American television series), Rennie's regular participation in Canadian productions gives him an opportunity to show a broader range of his acting abilities, which have been recognized by several awards.

Personal life
Rennie was born on 14 September 1960 in Sunderland, County Durham. When he was four years old, his family emigrated to Canada. Rennie was brought up in middle-class Edmonton, Alberta, as the second of three boys. He graduated from Strathcona High School, where he met and befriended Bruce McCulloch from The Kids in the Hall. He dropped out of college and took up all sorts of odd jobs, leaving Edmonton for brief stays in Vancouver and Toronto before eventually settling in Vancouver. After a serious bout with alcoholism in his youth, Rennie managed to get his addiction under control at age 33 and was finally able to commit to acting.

He likes painting and admires abstract expressionist artists such as Basquiat, Motherwell and Pollock (the Champion spark-plug logo tattoo on his right arm is an homage to Stuart Davis). An enthusiastic mountain climber in his youth, Rennie still practices various sports. He loves a game of hockey but is, above all, an avid golfer.

Career

Early work
Working at the campus radio of University of Alberta led Rennie to discover acting at age 25. He started his career on stage, performing at the A.B.O.P. Theatre in Edmonton in Amerika, a play adapted from Franz Kafka's novel and followed with the critically acclaimed American Buffalo during the Edmonton International Fringe Festival. After attending Bruhanski Theatre Studio in Vancouver, he had his first professional theatrical performance in 1989 in Sally Clark's Lost Souls and Missing Persons, a Touchstone Theatre production. This earned him an invitation to work at the Shaw Festival where he appeared in Man and Superman and in Pinero's Trelawny of the Wells (1990).

1993–2001
Rennie's first appearance on screen was in the indie Canadian film Purple Toast, filmed in 1990 and released in 1993. Also in 1993, he began to take small roles in television (Highlander, Forever Knight, and the revamped version of The Outer Limits). Rennie's profile within the Canadian industry was heightened during this period by leading roles in the television films Paris or Somewhere (1994) and For Those Who Hunt the Wounded Down (1996). Due to several disagreements during the production of the latter film, Rennie vowed never to work for the CBC again, though he has remained a staunch supporter of the Canadian industry as a whole. After his first appearance on The X-Files, he was offered the role of Alex Krycek but turned it down because he did not want to commit to a television series at that time. His career gained momentum quickly and larger roles in Canadian films followed (the independent short film Frank's Cock by Mike Hoolboom, and Mina Shum's Double Happiness as Sandra Oh's love interest, for which he was nominated for a Genie Award as best supporting actor). He also had more important roles on television series, as in a two-parter for La Femme Nikita.

His most prominent early roles were as guitar player Billy Tallent in Bruce McDonald's Hard Core Logo (1996) and as detective Stanley Raymond Kowalski in the third and fourth seasons of CTV series Due South, which aired in over 150 countries. The Canadian band Billy Talent is named after his Hard Core Logo character. As for his part in Due South, it has been said that his "disaffected intensity and hungover good looks" added an edge to the series.

Rennie was then seen in the recurrent roles of the convenience store guru Newbie on Don McKellar's cult television series Twitch City and of detective Bobby Marlowe on the award-winning series Da Vinci's Inquest.

His interpretation of sex marathoner Craig Zwiller in Don McKellar's Last Night earned him his first Genie Award (1999). After a role in David Cronenberg's eXistenZ (1999), his first international success on the big screen was his appearance as the thug Dodd in Christopher Nolan's Memento (2000). The same year, he impersonated a chilling yet seductive drifter in Suspicious River.

2002–present
With the father characters of Falling Angels (2003) and Flower and Garnet (2002), Rennie expanded to playing more mature roles, rather than young, self-destructive rebels. He also impersonated self-controlled Inspector Wood in the period drama Torso: The Evelyn Dick Story (2002) and appeared as the quiet dyslexic painter of Wilby Wonderful (2004).

He has played guest roles in episodes of various Canadian or US television series like Mutant X, The Dead Zone, Smallville, Supernatural, The L Word, Bionic Woman and more recently Harper's Island. During the same time, he has interpreted contrasting characters in movies such as The Butterfly Effect, H2O: the Last Prime Minister, The Five People You Meet in Heaven, Blade: Trinity (2004), Lucid (2005), Unnatural & Accidental (2006), The Invisible, Tin Man, Normal, Silk (2007), and The X-Files: I Want to Believe (2008).

His recurring role as the Cylon Leoben Conoy in the reimagined Battlestar Galactica (2003–09) and his portrayal of the record producer Lew Ashby throughout the second season of Californication (2008) have earned him a new wide and international recognition.

In 2009–10, Rennie played a character named Jeff Slingerland aka Dr. Maurice Raynaud on the ABC series FlashForward. Before the series was cancelled, David Goyer, who had previously directed him in Blade and The Invisible, mentioned he would be back and was slated to appear in the second season. He also appeared as Russian mobster Vladimir Laitanan in the eighth season of 24.

In Fall 2010, he played the lead role of Detective Brian Sullivan on Shattered, a series about a detective who suffers from multiple personality disorder. It aired in Canada on Global TV, followed by airings in other countries, though not the United States. Rennie received critical acclaim for his performance, and in 2011 won the Gemini and Leo awards for the role. Shattered was not renewed for a second season.

His 2010 appearances on the big screen included the Canadian film Gunless, a Western comedy starring Paul Gross, as a bounty hunter on the trail of Gross' Montana Kid. He also reprised his role as Billy Tallent for a short appearance in Trigger. Trigger is part of several films set in the same universe as Hard Core Logo, directed again by Bruce McDonald; this one, starring Molly Parker and Tracy Wright, written by Daniel MacIvor, is about the reunion of two women who used to be in an alternative rock band together. Rennie also served as one of Trigger's executive producers. Another film, Faith, Fraud & Minimum Wage, based on Canadian playwright Josh MacDonald's play Halo, has been completed and is waiting for release.

Rennie made a number of television appearances in 2011, including a supporting role on The Killing as Rick Felder, Detective Sarah Linden's fiancé. He also guest starred on Alphas, CSI: Miami and Rookie Blue.

Rennie was also cast as a series regular on the NBC series The Firm. He plays Ray McDeere, the brother of the principal character, Mitch McDeere, played by Josh Lucas. It began airing as a midseason replacement for the 2011–12 season.

In 2015, Rennie was cast as a main character for the second season of Amazon's The Man in the High Castle. He joined the cast in the role of Gary Connell, leader of the West Coast Resistance movement.

Filmography

Film

Television

Awards and nominations

References

External links

 

1960 births
Living people
Male actors from Edmonton
Canadian male film actors
Canadian male television actors
English emigrants to Canada
Best Actor in a Drama Series Canadian Screen Award winners
Best Supporting Actor Genie and Canadian Screen Award winners
Naturalized citizens of Canada